A Murder of Quality is the second novel by John le Carré, published in 1962. It features George Smiley, the most famous of le Carré's recurring characters, in his only book set outside the espionage community.

Plot summary
Long retired since the war, Ailsa Brimley is now the editor of a small Christian magazine called Christian Voice. The magazine's membership is small but loyal, and many of its readers have been supporters of the magazine since its inception. Unexpectedly, Brimley receives a letter from a reader, Stella Rode, who claims that her husband, a public school junior master in the town of Carne, is plotting to kill her. Fearing for Stella's life, Brimley hunts down her former wartime colleague, the retired Circus spy George Smiley, and asks him to help. Smiley, who knows the brother of school teacher Terence Fielding, agrees to do what he can, but before he is able to intervene, learns that Rode has been murdered. Brimley, feeling a duty of care to Rode on account of her family's long history as magazine subscribers, asks Smiley to go down and see what he can do to help. Smiley agrees and goes down to Carne to find out what he can about Rode's situation.

Upon arrival, Smiley becomes a victim of village gossip, on account of his wife, Ann, and her childhood connection to Carne. Now that they are living apart, Smiley is privately ridiculed by many of the town's occupants. Smiley is introduced to the town's police chief, who shares details about the case with Smiley. Rode was found alone in her house by her husband Stanley, and had been killed in a period of time where he claimed to be out of the house, returning to Fielding's house to collect his bag which he had forgotten, and contained many of the students' exams which he needed to mark. Any footprints were lost in the subsequent increased police presence at the house after the body was discovered. The chief's superior believes that the murder was perpetrated by a homeless madwoman who Rode knew, but Smiley remains unconvinced. He also witnesses invidious class division between "town and gown" which is superimposed upon a religious division between adherents of the Church of England and Nonconformists. As the wife of the only public school teacher who was himself not public school-educated (Stanley graduated from a grammar school), and as a nonconformist, Stella Rode occupied a low rank in the local social hierarchy, especially in the estimation of Carne's upper crust.

Smiley begins to make contact with the village's occupants. He dines with Fielding, attends the funeral, and makes contact with Rode's husband. Whilst walking home from a visit, he is startled by Mad Janie, the homeless woman being sought in connection with the murder. She tells him that the murderer merely 'flew away on the clouds' after she witnessed it. Despite this, the police still believe her to be the perpetrator, and eventually find and arrest her.

Smiley and Brimley become confused by the lack of any material evidence to the crime scene, and the rather cluttered nature of the Rode's conservatory. Smiley learns that Stella was a volunteer for a refugee charity, and that many of the boxes were processed by her and then sent to a distribution centre. This leads Smiley to believe that the evidence may have been removed from the site via a box, so he has Brimley locate the box, confirming his theory. In the meantime, Tim Perkins, a boy in Fielding's school house, becomes the second victim of the murderer, and is found lying dead at the side of the road after being killed in a hit and run.

Smiley returns to Rode, anxious to obtain any more information about Stella in the hope that he can catch both her and Perkins' murderer, believing both crimes to be linked. Under pressure, Stanley Rode buckles and admits that his wife was severely two-faced. In public, she would present herself as apparently pious and ostentatious, whilst in private, his wife was a pathological liar who emotionally abused him and viciously beat her own dog in order to portray him as mentally insane. Smiley also learns that Stella's social situation in Carne was brought on by her own actions, in which she habitually humiliated, blackmailed, and terrorised the town's residents, unable to be touched on account of her knowledge of intimate details of people's social faux pas and private secrets, as well as her kindly external demeanour.

As a result of this, Smiley is able to follow clues to the real murderer, Terence Fielding. Fielding attempted to frame Stanley for the murder, but failed, and had murdered Stella because she was blackmailing him over his wartime conviction of gross indecency with another male member of the Royal Air Force. Fielding was also blackmailed by the school authorities, who used their knowledge of his conviction in order to force him into remaining at his teaching post but on insecure short term contracts with no prospect of a retirement pension. Tim Perkins had accidentally made a discovery that would have derailed Fielding's attempts to implicate Stanley Rode, and would have reassigned the obvious blame to Fielding, despite Fielding maintaining that whatever Perkins had seen was insignificant.

Fielding fails in his attempt to frame Rode, and consigns himself to arrest. Despite his attempts to misdirect Smiley by saying he loved Perkins, the police arrive and arrest him.

Television and radio adaptations
John le Carré himself adapted the novel for Thames Television. A Murder of Quality was shown on the ITV network in 1991. It stars Denholm Elliott as George Smiley, Glenda Jackson as Ailsa Brimley, Joss Ackland as Terence Fielding, Billie Whitelaw as Mad Janie, David Threlfall as Stanley Rode and a teenage Christian Bale as Tim Perkins.

The novel was read on BBC Radio 4's Story Time in 1976, and dramatised on the same station in 1981. More recently, in 2009, BBC Radio 4 broadcast A Murder of Quality as the second in a series which featured all the Smiley novels (The Complete Smiley), with Simon Russell Beale in the main role.

References

External links

1962 British novels
British novels adapted into television shows
Novels by John le Carré
Victor Gollancz Ltd books